KMH is a three-letter abbreviation that may refer to:
 Johan Pienaar Airport, an airport in Northern Cape province, South Africa (IATA code)
 Kate Miller-Heidke, Australian singer and songwriter
 Kelli Maria Hand, American techno musician and DJ
 Royal College of Music, Stockholm (Kungliga Musikhögskolan i Stockholm), music school in Sweden

kmh may refer to:
 Kalam language, a language of Papua New Guinea (ISO 639-3 code)

km/h may refer to:
 kilometres per hour, a unit of speed
 km/h (TV series), a Quebec television sitcom